Billy Craig was an Australian professional rugby league footballer who played in the 1920s.  He played for Balmain as a centre but also played as a winger and a fullback.

Playing career
Craig made his debut for Balmain in 1922 against Eastern Suburbs at Birchgrove Oval which ended in a 4–4 draw.  

In 1924, Craig moved to the centres and was a member of the 1924 premiership winning side defeating South Sydney 3–0 in the grand final.  Craig played one more season before retiring at the end of 1925.

References

Balmain Tigers players
New South Wales rugby league team players
Australian rugby league players
Rugby league players from Sydney
Rugby league wingers
Rugby league centres